Henry Harold "Cotton" Pippen (April 2, 1911 – February 15, 1981) was a  Major League Baseball right-handed pitcher for three years with St. Louis Cardinals (1936), Philadelphia Athletics (1939), and Detroit Tigers (1939–1940). Pippen was born in Cisco, Texas, where his father was a rancher. He was nicknamed "Cotton" because of the color of his light blond hair and blue eyes. Over three seasons in the Major Leagues, Pippen won 5 games and lost 16 with a career earned run average of 6.38. His 12 losses in 1939 was 10th highest in the American League.

In 1936, Pippen struck out Ted Williams in his first professional at bat in the Pacific Coast League. Pippen's minor league career included stints with the Beatrice Blues in the Nebraska State League (1934–35); Houston in the Texas League (1936–1938); Sacramento in the Pacific Coast League (1939); the Oakland Oaks in the Pacific Coast League (1945–1946). He won 20 games for Oakland in 1943. 

Pippen served in the military for two years during World War II.  he made a comeback after the war and paid for several pro clubs. In 1951, Pippen was the player-manager for Reno. An Oakland newspaper reported in 1954 that Pippen was "now pitching them over the bar at Oscar's on Lakeshore". Pippen reportedly tended bar at a number of establishments in the Oakland area. He died in 1981 at age 69 at a convalescent home in Williams, California.

References

External links

 Biography and Photographs
 Nebraska Minor League Biography and Photo

1911 births
1981 deaths
St. Louis Cardinals players
Philadelphia Athletics players
Detroit Tigers players
Major League Baseball pitchers
Baseball players from Texas
Houston Buffaloes players
Sacramento Solons players
Oakland Oaks (baseball) players
Anniston Rams players
Chattanooga Lookouts players
Portland Beavers players
Reno Silver Sox players
Texas A&M Aggies baseball players
People from Cisco, Texas